Zeldin is an eastern Ashkenazic matronymic surname derived from the combination of the Yiddish female personal name Zelde (from the Middle High German word sælde meaning ‘fortunate’, ‘blessed’, or 'happiness'.) + the eastern Slavic possessive suffix -in. Notable people with the surname include:

Lee Zeldin  (born 1980), U.S. Representative from New York; former New York state senator
Theodore Zeldin (born 1933), British philosopher, sociologist, historian, writer and public speaker
Vladimir Zeldin (1915–2016), Russian theatre and cinema actor.

References

Jewish surnames
Matronymic surnames